142nd Army Division(3rd Formation) was formed in November 1969 and designated in December.

The division directly belonged to the Guangzhou Military Region, while it was administered by the 42nd Army Corps. It was stationed in Huiyang, Guangdong for an agricultural production mission.

In March 1977 the division was disbanded and absorbed by Independent Division of Guangdong Provincial Military District.

References

Infantry divisions of the People's Liberation Army
Military units and formations established in 1969
Military units and formations disestablished in 1977